Georg Keppler (7 May 1894 – 16 June 1966) was a high-ranking Waffen-SS commander during World War II. He commanded the SS Division Das Reich, SS Division Totenkopf, I SS Panzer Corps, III SS Panzer Corps and the XVIII SS Army Corps.

Career

Georg Keppler joined the army in 1913 and took part in World War I. Between 1920 and 1934, Keppler was a police officer commanding city and state police units. In 1935, he joined the paramilitary force of the Nazi Party, SS-Verfügungstruppe, eventually leading a battalion in the ”Deutschland” regiment. In September 1938, after the Anschluss, Keppler was promoted to command the newly raised “Der Führer” regiment,  becoming a component of the SS-Verfügungs Division. Keppler served as Der Führer‘s regimental commander throughout the invasion of France, Balkans Campaign and in Operation Barbarossa. In August 1940, Keppler was awarded the Knight's Cross of the Iron Cross. On 15 July 1941, he took over for injured Theodor Eicke as a commander of the SS Division Totenkopf. He went on to command the SS Division Nord and the SS Division Das Reich.

From February 1943, Keppler held a number of administrative positions within the Waffen-SS. In August 1944, he was given a field assignment as commander of the I SS Panzer Corps, which he led until October 1944, during the later stages of the Battle of Normandy.  He then returned to the Eastern Front, where he took over the III Panzer Corps. He remained with this unit until 2 April 1945 when he became the last commander of the XVIII SS Army Corps, surrendering the unit to the U.S. Army on 2 May 1945. After the war Keppler was interned; he was released in 1948. Keppler died in 1966.

Decorations
Knight's Cross of the Iron Cross on 15 August 1940 as SS-Oberführer and commander of SS-Standarte "Der Führer".

References

Citations

Bibliography

 

1894 births
1966 deaths
Military personnel from Mainz
People from Rhenish Hesse
German Army  personnel of World War I
SS-Obergruppenführer
Recipients of the Knight's Cross of the Iron Cross
Recipients of the clasp to the Iron Cross, 1st class
Prussian Army personnel
Waffen-SS personnel
German prisoners of war in World War II held by the United States